Nemesio Jiménez (born 10 February 1946) is a Spanish former cyclist. He competed in the team time trial at the 1968 Summer Olympics.

References

External links
 

1946 births
Living people
Spanish male cyclists
Olympic cyclists of Spain
Cyclists at the 1968 Summer Olympics
Sportspeople from Toledo, Spain
Cyclists from Castilla-La Mancha
20th-century Spanish people